A dental spa is a dental facility supervised by a licensed Oral Health Care Provider in which dental services are provided alongside spa treatments.

"Spa dentistry" refers to dental practices that offer many services not normally associated with dental care: facials, paraffin wax hand treatment, reflexology, micro-dermabrasion, massage therapy, Botox and Restylane treatment, and many other pampering, therapeutic and rejuvenating offerings. The administration of Botox and Restylane is based on each respective state's dental board approval.

Etymology
The American Dental Association notes that the consumer media have coined the term "dental spa," but many practices offer services and amenities specifically designed to relax patients without considering themselves a "spa." The loose definition of "dental spas" makes it difficult if not impossible to know how many dental spas exist in the United States.

In 2003, Lynn Watanabe, DDS of the Dental Spa in Pacific Palisades, California, and the Day Spa Association, defined a dental spa as "a facility whose dental program is run under the strict supervision of a licensed Oral Health Care Provider, which might be a Dentist or an Independent Dental Hygienist. Services are provided that integrate both traditional and non-traditional dental and spa treatments (such as massage therapy, skincare and body treatments)."

History
Ancient civilizations such as the Greeks and Chinese all used certain methods to relax a person suffering from ailments such as a toothache. The "barber surgeon" in the 18th and 19th century allowed barbers to perform some dental procedures as well as shaves and haircuts. The term "spa dentistry" (synonymous to dental spa) was used in the 18th century to describe dental practitioners in Bath, England. Ms. Curris, a female dentist in 18th century Bath likely created the first dental spa, offering patients dentistry with skin and bodycare.

The terms "dental spa" and "spa dentistry" began to be more publicly used in the late 1990s. In 1998, Lorin Berland DDS, reserved the name DallasDentalSpa.com.

Timeline

1990s
1994 London's The Guardian has identified the Atlanta Center for Cosmetic Dentistry as "one of the first of these new dental spas." The February 19, 2007 edition reported that Debra Gray King, DDS, began providing spa services at the Atlanta Center for Cosmetic Dentistry in 1994.

1996 Lorin Berland DDS began providing a massage therapist on staff.

1999 On July 11, 1999, The New York Times reported several Long Island dentists were offering "distraction techniques" by offering massage therapy to their patients. The article reports that massage services were offered since early 1999.

2000s
2001 On October 1, 2002, Salt Lake Magazine reported that the Dental Spa in Sugar House provided patients with complimentary spa services such as temple massage, hand treatments, eye masks, and other techniques aimed at calming the patients.  The spa services were provided since the Spa's inception in 2001.

2002 On August 12, 2002, the Los Angeles Times reported Lynn Watanabe, DDS, one of the field's "pioneers," opened "Dental Spa" in Pacific Palisades, California, with a full-time esthetician and full-time massage therapist.

Other early adopters
The Wall Street Journal noted Jeff Golub-Evans of New York and Grace Sun of Los Angeles,

Prevalence
In 2003, the American Dental Association reported that more than 50% of 427 practicing dentists surveyed at their annual session offered some sort of spa or office amenity. In 2005, as many as 5% of the American Dental Association's more than 152,000 members had declared themselves "dental spas".  In 2007, the ADA estimated that possibly that one in every 20 dental offices in the United States actually offers, to some extent, some spa dentistry services to their patients.

Professional associations
In 1978, the Holistic Dental Association was formed to focus on the mind-body connection and the dental patient's well-being. Spa dentistry is recognized by the International Medical Spa Association and the Day Spa Association, but similar to the field of cosmetic dentistry, is not recognized as a specialty practice area by the American Dental Association. In 2002, Lynn Watanabe, DDS founded the first dental spa association with the creation of the International Dental Spa Association.  The New York Times reported in 2006 that "it now has ten members and are coming up with guidelines for what services constitute a dental spa."

Dental fear studies
One of the main reasons people avoid visiting the dentist is dental anxiety. Dental anxiety drives some people to create more dental problems by not visiting the dentist on a regular basis. Patients who are high in dental anxiety have the greatest likelihood of avoiding dental treatment. An estimated nine percent to fifteen percent of the American population—about 30 million to 40 million people—avoid essential dental care because of fear or anxiety.

The first known scientific study on dental fear occurred in 1954. Dental anxiety has been a well-studied phenomenon since the late 1960s.  Since then, studies and several books report successful treatment of patients with dental fear using behavioral methods.

Variations
Although there are many variations, adapters of the dental spa concept generally offer cosmetic, general, and restorative dentistry with a key focus on making the visit a pampering and pleasant experience.

See also

References

Further reading
Say Ahh! at the Dental Spa Fox News. Accessed September 13, 2007.

Dentistry
Dental